Raheela Agha is a Pakistani actress. She is known for her roles in dramas Meherbaan, Ghughi, Sara Sajeeda and Naagin.

Early life
Raheela was born in 1964 in Lahore, Pakistan. She completed her studies from University of Lahore.

Career
She made her debut as an on PTV in 1970s. She was noted for her roles in dramas Hulla Ray, Ek Sitam Aur Sahi, Piya Be Dardi, Jaan Nisar and Kaun Karta Hai Wafa. She also appeared in dramas Mil Ke Bhi Hum Na Mile, Kaise Huaye Benaam, Kitna Satatay Ho, Ishq Ibadat and Tum Mere Kya Ho and she also appeared movies Mohabbataan Sachiyaan, Tarap, Basanti, Gulabo and Lado Rani. She appeared in Urdu, Pashto and Punjabi movies and dramas. Since then she appeared in dramas Ali Ki Ammi, Meherbaan, Maana Ka Gharana, Ghughi, Sara Sajeeda and Naagin.

Personal life
Raheela was married to producer Asad Butt who died. They had three children a son named Zeeshan Butt and a daughter.

Filmography

Television

Film

References

External links
 
 
 

1964 births
Living people
20th-century Pakistani actresses
Actresses in Punjabi cinema
Pakistani television actresses
Actresses in Pashto cinema
21st-century Pakistani actresses
Pakistani film actresses
Actresses in Urdu cinema